This article features the 2003 CONCACAF U-20 Tournament qualifying stage. Caribbean and Central American teams entered in separate tournaments. The North American teams Canada and Mexico automatically qualified, as well as main tournament hosts Panama (Central America) and the United States (North America). Eighteen Caribbean teams entered, of which two qualified and five Central American teams entered, of which two qualified.

Caribbean

Preliminary round
Saint Lucia received a bye because Anguilla withdrew.

|}

Group stage

Group A
All matches were played in Suriname.

Group B
Montserrat withdrew in this group.

Group C
All matches were played in Saint Kitts and Nevis. Antigua and Barbuda were disqualified, they were supposed to be group host but were too late informing that their field was unavailable for play.

Group D

Final round

|}

Central America

Qualified for Main Tournament
  (Caribbean winners)
  (Caribbean winners)
  (Central American winners)
  (Central American runners-up)

See also
 2003 CONCACAF U-20 Tournament

External links
Results by RSSSF

CONCACAF U-20 Championship qualification
2003 in youth association football